The Battle of Clark's Mill was a battle of the American Civil War, occurring on November 7, 1862 on Bryant Creek just north of the community of Vera Cruz in central Douglas County, Missouri.

Captain Hiram E. Barstow, a Union commander at Clark's Mill, received reports that Confederate troops were in the area. Capt. Barstow sent a detachment toward Gainesville, and led another southeastward where Barstow's men ran into a Confederate force at the confluence of Bryant and Fox Creeks, south of the community of Bertha. Following a skirmish, the Confederate force was driven back. Barstow and his men then fell back to Clark's Mill, where he learned that another Confederate force was coming from the northeast. Unlimbering artillery to command both approach roads, Barstow was soon engaged in a five-hour fight with the enemy. Under a white flag, the Confederates demanded a surrender; the Union, given their numerical inferiority, accepted. The Confederates paroled the Union troops and departed after burning the blockhouse at Clark's Mill. Clark's Mill helped the Confederates to maintain a toehold in southwest Missouri.

The battle took place in central Douglas County, approximately 10 miles east of Ava.  The area of the battle was near the historic county seat of Vera Cruz, near the confluence of Bryant and Hunter Creeks.

References
 U.S. National Park Service CWSAC Battle Summary
 CWSAC Report Update

External links
 The Battle of Clark's Mill, Watersheds.org

Clark's Mill 1862
Clark's Mill 1862
Clark's Mill 1862
Clark's Mill 1862
Douglas County, Missouri
1862 in the American Civil War
1862 in Missouri
November 1862 events